Wout Buitenweg (24 December 1893 – 10 November 1976) was a Dutch footballer who scored 14 goals in 11 games for the Dutch national side.

Club career
A prolific striker, Buitenweg played for hometown clubs UVV and Hercules as well as for BVC De Built.

International career
Buitenweg made his debut for the Netherlands in a November 1913 friendly match against England and earned a total of 11 caps, scoring 14 goals. At the 1928 Summer Olympics, Buitenweg was used in a different position than his usual as a center forward in the first game against Uruguay and he demanded to be changed to his favourite position at half time. The coaches agreed, but the move did not work out well as they lost 0-2 and Buitenweg never played for the national team again.

References

External links
 

1893 births
1976 deaths
Footballers from Utrecht (city)
Association football forwards
Dutch footballers
Netherlands international footballers
Olympic footballers of the Netherlands
Footballers at the 1928 Summer Olympics
Hercules players